Frank Eustace Turner (31 July 1886 – 11 June 1963) was an Australian rules footballer who played with St Kilda in the Victorian Football League (VFL).

Notes

External links 

1886 births
1963 deaths
Australian rules footballers from Victoria (Australia)
St Kilda Football Club players